USS Ogden may refer to the following ships of the United States Navy:

 , a Tacoma-class frigate commissioned in 1943; received three battle stars for World War II service.
 , an Austin-class amphibious transport dock; decommissioned 21 February 2007

United States Navy ship names